Akrar is a village in the Faroe Islands.

It is located on Lopransfjørður, an inlet, which itself is part of Vágsfjørður, on the east-side of Suðuroy, and was founded in 1817.

See also
List of towns in the Faroe Islands

External links
Faroeislands.dk: Akrar Images and description of all cities on the Faroe Islands.

Populated places in the Faroe Islands
Populated places established in 1817
Suðuroy